The Battle of Pine Island Ridge was a battle during the Second Seminole War fought on March 22, 1838, at the site of what is now Pine Island Ridge, Florida. According to US Army accounts, Major William Lauderdale surprised the Indians and drove them off Pine Island, which was an island in the Everglades at the time. However Seminole claim that scouts posted around the island had already alerted the Indians, allowing them to successfully evacuate the island.

References

1838 in the United States
Pine Island Ridge
Pine Island Ridge
Davie, Florida
March 1838 events